Mohammad Reza "Ajir" Ameli Tehrani (December 31, 1927–May 8, 1979) was an Iranian physician and pan-Iranist politician. He served as a minister in the cabinets of Jafar Sharif-Emami and Gholam-Reza Azhari. He was sentenced to death by the Revolutionary Court, and subsequently executed on 8 May 1979.

Early life and education
Ameli was born in 1927.  He graduated from the University of Tehran's Medical College. Then he completed his residency specializing in anesthesiology. He began working at the University’s Medical College faculty.

Trial and execution
The Islamic Revolutionary Tribunal of Tehran found Mohammad Reza Ameli Tehrani, as well as 20 other individuals, “corruptor on earth” and condemned him to death. These 21 persons were executed by a firing squad in Tehran on 8 May 1979.

References

External links

1927 births
1979 deaths
Pan-Iranist Party politicians
Rastakhiz Party politicians
Education ministers of Iran
People executed by Iran by firing squad
Politicians executed during the Iranian Revolution
Iranian nationalists
Members of the 22nd Iranian Majlis
Members of the 24th Iranian Majlis
Politicians from Tehran
Academic staff of Tehran University of Medical Sciences
20th-century Iranian politicians